Lothar Mohn (born 6 November 1954) is a German church musician.

After studying church music at the Hochschule für Kirchenmusik der Evangelischen Kirche von Westfalen (University of Protestant Church Music) in Herford, he was the cantor of the Petrikirche in Melle and regional cantor from 1982 to 1991. In 1991, he succeeded Erhard Egidi as cantor of the Neustädter Kirche in Hanover and church music director. At the church, he leads the Kantorei St. Johannis, a handbell choir and a senior choir.

He was the initiator of the foundation Musikstiftung St. Johannis. From 1997 to 2006, he was president of the association of church musicians in the Protestant Landeskirche Hanover. From 2007 to 2008, he was president of the national association. He was co-editor of the journal "Forum Kirchenmusik".

Selected publications 

as author 
 Die Christian-Vater-Orgel in der St.-Petri-Kirche zu Melle in „Der Grönegau“. In: Meller Jahrbuch. vol. 6 (1988), ps. 52–69.
 Chorbuch Mendelssohn (Chor & Orgel), Jubiläumsausgabe zum 200. Geburtstag Mendelssohns. ISMN M-007-09340-2, Carus-Verlag CV 4.105

as editor
 Gott loben – das ist unser Amt. Orgelvorspiele zum Evangelischen Gesangbuch. ISMN M-2007-1651-1

References

External links 

 
 Kantorei St. Johannis 
 Handglockenchor Hannover 
 Musikstiftung St. Johannis 
 Neustädter Hof- und Stadtkirche St. Johannis, Hannover 
 Mit dem Zyklus der Psalmen durch's Jahr / Chöre und Kirchenmusiker realisierten Großprojekt in der Region Hannover kirche-hannover.de 3 August 2012 

German male musicians
German music educators
1954 births
Living people